, also known in Japan as KaiYari for short, is a Japanese fantasy light novel series written by Rui Tsukiyo and illustrated by Shiokonbu. It began serialization online in December 2016 on the user-generated novel publishing website Shōsetsuka ni Narō. It was later acquired by Kadokawa Shoten, who have published the series since July 2017 under their Kadokawa Sneaker Bunko imprint.

A manga adaptation with art by Sōken Haga has been serialized online via Kadokawa Shoten's Young Ace Up website since October 2017. An anime television series adaptation by TNK aired from January to March 2021.

Premise
Keyaru, who is exploited and sexually abused repeatedly by others due to being a healing magician, notices what lays just beyond his healing magic, and is convinced that a healing magician is the strongest class in the world. However, by the time he realizes his own potential, he is already deprived of everything. Thus, using his healing magic, enhanced by the magic enhancing properties of the Philosopher's Stone on the world itself, he goes back four years into the past, deciding to redo everything and get revenge on the ones who abused him and take down a corrupted empire.

Characters
 

The Healing Hero and the series' main protagonist, who was blessed with the hero's insignia from the coming-of-age. He, however, wanted to save the world from demons only to endure four years of physical, mental, and sexual abuse at the hands of his own allies, making him see how corrupted the Jioral Kingdom is. In the midst of the battle with the demon lord, Eve, Keyaru managed to retain himself finding the true nature of his power and obtains the Philosopher's Stone. Instead of handing it to Flare as instructed, he uses the item to travel back in time, all while being able to maintain his memories of the original timeline, to exact revenge against his torturers and bring down Jioral. During this, he changes his appearance and renames himself Keyarga. His thirst for revenge and mostly psychopathic personality (gained for the torture he endured) makes him an anti-hero, although he does have a caring side.
 

The Magic Hero and the first princess of the Jioral Kingdom. Flare is the main source of Keyaru's suffering and merely sees him as a baggage carrier and drugs him so he would be receptive to her commands. Generally, she saw healing magicians as the lowest class in the magic world until Keyaru has proven otherwise and doesn't trust her with the Philosopher's Stone. In the alternate timeline, when Flare is left vulnerable, Keyaru tortures her, takes her powers, erases and alters her memories and appearance to become his companion and lover named Freia, all while deceiving everyone into thinking that Flare is dead. As Freia, she is lovable, kind, and obeys Keyarga's every command. She is one of Keyarga's closest allies. 

A female demi-human slave that Keyaru buys and recruits into his party. Prior to this, she was infected with an illness (which Keyarga helps to cure), but her rage allows her to withstand it. Setsuna comes from the Ice Wolf clan whereas estranged from humanity and usually sold into slavery that defeats the purpose of equality in the Jioral Kingdom. As Keyarga offers her the chance to avenge her tribe, she reveals her unspoken true name to receive empowering strength from Keyarga, allowing him to gain control over her. Setsuna later becomes sexually attached to Keyarga and often competes with Freia for his affections. Similar to Freia, she is also Keyarga closest companion.  

A demon who is one of the candidates to become the Demon Lord. In the previous timeline where she did become the Demon Lord and fought Keyaru in the bitter end, she tearfully begged him to spare her and granted him the Philosopher's Stone, prompting Keyaru to know what she was really trying to protect. Her objective is to kill the current Demon Lord for trying to exterminate her brethren. When she completes the trials of Caladrius, her hair changes from black to silver. In the alternate timeline, she becomes a member of Keyarga's group. Unlike the other girls, she is not entirely comfortable with having sex with Keyarga.
 

The second princess of Jioral Kingdom, and younger sister of Flare. Both sisters had a close relationship until Flare received a higher reputation for awakening as the Magic Hero and belittles Norn. Compared to her big sister, Norn runs her kingdom in a sadistic and manipulative manner and aims to drive Flare out of the throne. Following Flare's apparent murder, Norn meant to gain aid from neighboring kingdoms by exterminating all innocent demons, after her soldiers killed a friend that Keyarga got to know. She is the first to discover that Flare is still alive and is the only person who knows this besides Keyarga. He and Freia halt her oppression plot and capture her. As he did with Flare, Keyarga erases and alters Norn's memories and appearance to become his little sister named Ellen. As Ellen, she has a brother complex and views Freia as a "big sister". She is also a very close companion to Keyarga, just like Freia and Setsuna.  

A female knight of Jioral Kingdom, renowned as the Blade Goddess. Kureha owes Keyaru her gratitude for fixing her amputated arm from their first meeting. She initially opposes Keyaru's party after believing that they were attacking soldiers who were trying to protect Setsuna's village (not realizing that the soldiers were actually threatening the villagers), but allies with them after learning of her kingdom's atrocities. Freia pretends to be her old self to yield Kureha to her words. After being exposed to aphrodisiac and becoming obedient ally, Kureha has sex with Keyaru for her mistakes and acts as an informant for him. Her constant flirting with Keyaru makes the other girls jealous. 

The Cannon Hero. Having an obsessive sexual attraction to young boys, he targets Keyaru for rape and murder. Due to the trauma, Keyarga will not allow a single male into his party, preferring only females. 

The Sword Hero, affiliated with the Jioral Kingdom. She has an intense homosexual infatuation that urges her to rape ideal girls to death. In the previous timeline, Blade would torment and physically beat up Keyaru every night for "touching" Flare to beset her frustration. Although she is one of Keyaru's torturers, Keyarga does not erase and alter her memories and appearance like how he did to Flare and Norn, instead leaving her to be killed by brainwashed men. 

A villager from the same village as Keyaru. Anna provides Keyaru food and shelter since his parents' deaths. She encourages Keyaru to follow his belief in changing the world for the better. While Anna cares for Keyaru as her kid, he acknowledges her as his first love. Anna is presented as a normal young woman of medium height with waist-length light brown hair. It is later discovered the Leonard had raped her and destroyed his home, which enrages Keyarga. She dies from the trauma before he can save her.

The antagonistic captain of the Jioral Kingdom's knights who lacks any sense of sympathy and lashes at the imprisoned Keyaru for doing "nothing." In the alternate timeline, Keyaru alters his face to resemble his own in order to trick Flare into arresting him, and then frames him for Flare's apparent murder. When Proum learns of this (although both he and Leonard are unaware that Flare is still alive), he is released and sent to hunt down Keyaru, who by now has changed his name to Keyarga. After murdering Anna, Keyarga takes his revenge on him by turning him into a girl, having him get raped by his brainwashed troops, and then burning them.

A merchant in the city of Lanaritta.

A store owner from the city of Branica with whom Keyaru forms a close bond. He is later killed by Norn's army.

A knight of the Jioral Kingdom and one of the Three Champions of his nation (it is unknown who the other two champions are). His perceived detection skill gave him the name "Hawkeye." He accompanies Norn during her attack on Branica. During his fight with Keyarga, he loses and gets killed before he can have his abilities copied.

The king of the Jioral Kingdom, Flare and Norn's "biological" father, and the series' main antagonist. He sends Leonard and later Bullet to hunt down Keyarga for devastating his kingdom and for the death of his daughters, little realizing that they are still alive. However, Proum's true form reveals that he is not human.

Media

Light novels
The series was first published online in December 2016 on the user-generated novel publishing website Shōsetsuka ni Narō by Rui Tsukiyo. It was later acquired by Kadokawa Shoten, who published the first volume as a light novel under their Kadokawa Sneaker Bunko imprint in July 2017.

On January 23, 2021, Tsukiyo tweeted in English, claiming that one overseas publisher refused to publish the series in English. They said that the situation may change if overseas publishers received enough requests. Tsukiyo also encouraged fans to check out the English version of their other light novel series, The World's Finest Assassin Gets Reincarnated in Another World as an Aristocrat, which is licensed by Yen Press.

Manga
A manga adaptation by Sōken Haga began serialization in Kadokawa Shoten's Young Ace Up website on October 24, 2017. Twelve volumes have been released as of February 2023.

A spin-off manga series illustrated by Ken Nagao, titled Kaifuku Jutsushi no Omotenashi (Hospitality of Healer), also began serialization in Young Ace Up on January 18, 2021.

Anime
An anime television series adaptation was announced by Kadokawa in November 2019. The series was animated by TNK and directed by Takuya Asaoka, with Kazuyuki Fudeyasu handling series composition, and Junji Goto designing the characters. The series aired for twelve episodes from January 13 to March 31, 2021, on Tokyo MX, KBS, AT-X, SUN, and BS11. The opening theme is  performed by Minami Kuribayashi, while the ending theme is  performed by ARCANA PROJECT.

There are three different versions of the anime: a censored broadcast version, a streaming-exclusive "Redo" version, and an uncensored "Complete Recovery" version. All of the stations airing the anime carried the broadcast version. In addition to airing the broadcast version at 11:30 p.m. JST, AT-X aired the "Complete Recovery" version on the same morning at 4:00 a.m. JST. The official Twitter account issued a content warning for the anime. Sentai Filmworks has licensed the anime outside Asia and German-speaking regions. Children's Playground Entertainment has licensed the series in Southeast Asia and is streaming it on Bilibili.

Episode list

Reception

Light novel and manga
The light novel series has over 800,000 copies in print. Both the light novel and the manga grew in their popularity, which led to an increase in digital sales. Several volumes of the manga also ranked in the top ten of Amazon Japan's manga charts.

Anime 
Since its airing, the anime adaptation of Redo of Healer gained higher than average percentage of female viewers and Tsukiyo expressed their surprise on Twitter.

The reviewers criticized the series for having a "generic" fantasy role-playing game inspired setting similar to popular isekai series and for "contrived" in-story justifications for its revenge plot.

Controversy 
The anime adaptation garnered controversy by viewers, particularly due to its depiction of extreme violence, gratuitous amounts of sexual content and rape, most elements often being used as a plot device, especially in the first two episodes. In Anime News Network's Winter 2021 Preview Guide, the series was panned by most of the reviewers for its recurring "rape and revenge", an aspect of the light novels that gained controversy before the anime premiere.

See also
 The World's Finest Assassin Gets Reincarnated in Another World as an Aristocrat, another light novel series by the same author

Notes

References

External links
  at Shōsetsuka ni Narō 
  
  
 Anime official Twitter 
 
 

2017 Japanese novels
2021 anime television series debuts
Anime and manga about revenge
Anime and manga based on light novels
Anime and manga controversies
AT-X (TV network) original programming
Censored television series
Dark fantasy anime and manga
Fiction about shapeshifting
Incest in anime and manga
Japanese LGBT-related animated television series
Japanese webcomics
Kadokawa Dwango franchises
Kadokawa Shoten manga
Kadokawa Sneaker Bunko
Light novels
Light novels first published online
Obscenity controversies in animation
Seinen manga
Self-censorship
Sentai Filmworks
Shōsetsuka ni Narō
TNK (company)
Webcomics in print
Works about rape
Works about sexual abuse
Works about sexual harassment
Works about torture
Works published under a pseudonym